Krrish is a 2006 Indian Hindi-language superhero sci fi film directed and produced by Rakesh Roshan. It stars Hrithik Roshan and Priyanka Chopra while Naseeruddin Shah, Rekha, Manini Mishra, Archana Puran Singh and Sharat Saxena feature in supporting roles. It is the second installment in the Krrish franchise, being the sequel to Koi... Mil Gaya, and relates the story of Krishna, the son of the previous film's protagonists, who inherits his father's superhuman abilities. After falling in love with Priya, he follows her to Singapore, where he takes on the persona of "Krrish" to keep his identity secret while saving children from a burning circus. From that moment on, he is regarded as a superhero, and must later thwart the plans of the evil Dr. Arya, who has a connection to Krishna's father, Rohit, the protagonist of the previous film.

Krrish was conceived to be a film of global significance and a trendsetter in Indian cinema, with visual effects on par with those from Hollywood. To that end, the effects team was aided by Hollywood's Marc Kolbe and Craig Mumma, and the stunts were choreographed by Chinese martial arts film expert Tony Ching. The music was composed by Rajesh Roshan, with the background score by Salim–Sulaiman. Filming was done to a large extent in Singapore as well as India.

Krrish released worldwide on 23 June 2006 at a budget of 40 crore and on 1000 prints, both near-record amounts for an Indian film at the time. Krrish received positive reviews from critics in India, got a record opening week at the box office. A blockbuster, Krrish grossed a worldwide total of 126 crore, becoming the third highest-grossing Indian film of 2006.

Krrish received 8 nominations at the 52nd Filmfare Awards, including Best Film, Best Director (Rakesh), Best Actor (Hrithik) and Best Supporting Actress (Rekha), and won 3 awards, including Best Special Effects. At the 8th IIFA Awards, the film received 9 nominations, and won 3 awards, including Best Actor (Hrithik). It also won the National Film Award for Best Special Effects. The third film in the series, Krrish 3 was released in 2013.

Plot 
Five-year-old Krishna Mehra is the son of scientist Rohit and his late wife Nisha. He lives in the small town of Kasauli. He undergoes an intelligence quotient (IQ) test by his school principal, who suspects that Krishna has superpowers like his father. His grandmother Sonia takes young Krishna to a remote mountain village to conceal his unique abilities. Years later, an adult Krishna meets vacationing friends Priya Kalyanan and Honey Arora, who live in Singapore. Krishna falls in love with Priya.

After returning home to Singapore, Priya and Honey are fired by their boss, Nayantara, for taking a vacation extension. To keep their jobs, Honey suggests making a television program about Krishna, aware that he has abilities. Priya calls him to join her in Singapore. Sonia objects, saying that people will exploit his abilities. She explains how Rohit got his powers and that Rohit too was called to Singapore and hired by a scientist, Dr. Siddhant Arya, to design a computer that could see the future. This was to prevent wars and prepare against natural disasters but Rohit discovered that the true purpose was not for good. He destroyed the computer and was killed by Siddhant. Krishna's mother, Nisha, died of trauma after giving birth to him. Krishna promises Sonia that he will never reveal his powers. In Singapore, Krishna keeps his word and reveals nothing exceptional about himself; Honey and Priya are fired again.

Krishna meets circus performer Kristian Li, who attempts to raise funds to pay for his young sister's leg surgery. He invites Krishna and Priya to his circus, where a fire breaks out during the performance. To save the children without revealing his identity, Krishna wears a broken black mask and his jacket inside-out, creating the persona "Krrish". Kristian discovers that Krishna is Krrish. As Krrish is being offered a reward for his deeds, Krishna tells Kristian to assume Krrish's identity so he can pay for his sister's surgery.

Priya and Honey discover that Krishna is the real Krrish upon seeing Priya's camera footage and decide to release it on TV to make Krishna a star. Krishna overhears them talking about how Priya had lied to him and is dejected.

Priya realises her mistake and stops her boss from revealing Krrish's identity. She meets Dr. Vikram Sinha, who has been searching for Krishna for years. He reveals that Rohit is still alive; after completing the computer, they saw Siddhant holding Rohit at gunpoint. Rohit understood that Siddhant was going to kill him. He destroyed it and was taken as a prisoner by Siddhant until he started a new computer.

In the present, Siddhant has rebuilt the computer after 20 years. He starts it to see his future and sees Krrish holding him at gunpoint. Siddhant kills Kristian, thinking he is Krrish. Krishna follows Siddhant to his remote island lair.

Siddhant kills Vikram and holds Rohit and Priya at gunpoint. Krishna saves Priya and Rohit and fatally wounds Siddhant. After Siddhant dies, Krishna and Priya take Rohit back to India, reuniting him with his mother Sonia. Rohit uses his late father's special computer to contact his alien friend Jadoo, whose spaceship is later seen. Krishna and Priya get married.

Cast
 Hrithik Roshan as Krishna "Krrish" Mehra / Dr. Rohit Mehra, Krishna's father (dual role)
 Priyanka Chopra as Priya Kalyanan, Krrish's love interest 
 Naseeruddin Shah as Dr. Siddhant Arya
 Sharat Saxena as Dr. Vikram Sinha, Dr.Arya’s head of security 
 Rekha as Sonia Mehra, Krishna's grandmother and Rohit's mother
 Manini Mishra as Honey Arora
 Archana Puran Singh as Nayantara, Priya and Honey's boss
 Bin Xia as Kristian Li / Krrish
 Hemant Pandey as Bahadur
 Puneet Issar as Komal Singh
 Akash Khurana as Father, Krrish's catholic school principal
 Kiran Juneja as Amisha Kalyanan, Priya's mother
 Yu Xuan as Kristian's sister
 Preity Zinta as Nisha Mehra, Krishna's mother and Rohit's wife (special appearance in flashback)
 Rakesh Roshan as Dr. Sanjay Mehra, Krishna's grandfather and Rohit's father (archived footage from previous film)

Production

Development
In November 2004, the Roshans confirmed they would produce a sequel to Koi... Mil Gaya (2003). They announced that actors Hrithik Roshan and Rekha would return for the sequel, but that Preity Zinta would be replaced by Priyanka Chopra. Chopra also confirmed the same, adding, "The story will start where Koi... Mil Gaya ended." Rakesh Roshan hoped that the film would be remembered as the first to prove that the Indian film industry is equal to Hollywood. He decided to push the story forward by focusing on the son of the previous films's protagonist, who would inherit his father's special abilities. The story combined elements of Indian mythology (the main character's name Krishna alludes to the Hindu Lord Krishna), Chinese martial arts and Hollywood films to set itself up as a film of global significance.

Pre-production

Rakesh Roshan wanted Krrish to be a trendsetter in Indian cinema, with visual effects on par with Hollywood films. He hired Hollywood special effects experts Marc Kolbe and Craig Mumma, who had both previously worked on such films as Independence Day, Godzilla and Sky Captain, to help create the visual effects for the film. Roshan also hired Hong Kong action director Tony Ching after admiring his work in Hero. Before production began, Hrithik Roshan went to China to train with Ching for the cable work that would be needed to make his character "fly". A story board of the film was prepared and sent to Ching to help him develop the action sequences. Additional production credits include: Farah Khan – choreographer, Samir Chanda and Sham Kaushal – art directors, Baylon Fonesca and Nakul Kamte – sound, Nahush Pise – makeup artist, Sham Kaushal – assistant action director.

Filming
Krrish was the first Indian film to be shot in Singapore under the Singapore Tourism Board's Film-in-Singapore subsidy scheme, and over 60% of the film was shot there. Shooting was accomplished on location over a span of 2 months, from September to November 2005. Locations featured included the Singapore Zoo, the Gateway building, and the Singapore National Library. Another major filming location was Robinson Road, where heavy rains caused production delays. The Singapore police were on location to block roads and protect the filming equipment, such as when the film's action scenes required two 250-foot high industrial cranes. Author Audrey Yue noted that the film shoot benefited Singapore by leading to domestic and Indian film-induced tourism.

Filming also took place in Manali and Film City in Mumbai. During filming of a flying stunt, one of the wires that was tied to Hrithik Roshan broke, causing him to fall 50 feet, though he landed safely on a shop's canopy. Hrithik described the incident as a "freak accident", stating, "I was skydiving to my death till I fell on a six-feet-long canopy of a shop that was out because of the slight drizzle. The canopy had iron rods. But I missed those rods too. What do I say? I guess the right word to describe the situation would be jadoo (magic)." Roshan also suffered other injuries during the film's production. He tore the hamstring in his right leg during a circus scene, singed his hair while running through fire in another action scene, and broke his thumb and toe during strenuous training for the wirework.

Post-production

Indian firm Prasad EFX assigned a team of more than 100 VFX specialists to work with Marc Kolbe and Craig Mumma to create the visual effects for the film. Included were sophisticated 3D modelling and computer animation, including whole body scans, 3D replicas of vehicles, fire sequences, complicated wire removals and compositing work. They prepared over 1,200 VFX shots, accounting for approximately 90 minutes of screen time. Describing the effects, Rakesh Roshan stated, "If you liked the visual effects in Koi... Mil Gaya, you will find them far better in Krrish. I do not think audiences have seen anything like this in Hindi films."

Music

The film's soundtrack, composed by Rajesh Roshan, was released on 30 April 2006 by T-Series. Lyricists included Ibraheem Ashk, Nasir Faraaz, and Vijay Akela. Salim–Sulaiman provided the background score. It became the seventh best-selling Bollywood soundtrack of the year.
Hindi

Tamil

Critical reviews of the soundtrack were generally favourable, though some in the media called it a disappointment. Joginder Tuteja of Bollywood Hungama gave the album a rating of 3.5 out of 5 stars, saying that it was "another good outing for Bollywood music lovers." He especially praised the songs "Chori Chori", "Koi Tumsa Nahi" and "Pyaar Ki Ek Kahaani." Sukanya Verma of Rediff gave a favourable review for the soundtrack's "catchy" songs. However, she felt that while the songs meshed with the film, "none of them bear the staying power of Rajesh Roshan's earlier soundtracks." Shruti Bhasin of Planet Bollywood enjoyed the original songs, giving 7.5 out of 10 stars, but was disappointed with the remixes. Dr. Mandar V. Bichu of Gulf News said that it did not live up to the pre-release expectations.

Marketing

As a part of the marketing, Merchandise were offered for sale prior to the film's release to maximize profits. These included action figures, masks, and other toys.

Release

Theatrical

The final budget of Krrish came to 40 crore, which at that time was considered a big-budget film by Hindi film standards. The film was released on 23 June 2006 with 1,000 prints. Krrish was simultaneously released along with dubbed versions in Tamil and Telugu languages. It was the first Indian film to receive payments in advance for product placement, music, and international distribution rights.

Home media

The film's DVD was released in Region 1 on 18 August 2006, by Adlabs. On 21 August 2006, it was released for all regions by Filmkraft. Adlabs also released a Blu-ray version.

Reception

Box office
Krrish had a good opening week, and tickets were reportedly selling for many times the original cost at some locations. Total gross collections were an Indian record of 41.6 crore (29.7 crore nett) for its opening week. Krrish became the fourth-highest-grossing film of 2006, earning over 69 crore nett in India alone, and was classified as a "Blockbuster" by Box Office India. It also grossed 31.68 crore in the overseas market, where it was declared a "hit". The final worldwide total gross was 126 crore. One week after Krrish was released, another superhero film, Superman Returns was released in India. Rakesh Roshan stated, "I was a little skeptical that Superman might hurt me, but fortunately it didn't." In fact, Krrish fared better at the box office in India than Superman Returns did.

Critical response

India

Krrish received positive reviews from critics in India. Taran Adarsh of Bollywood Hungama believed that the film surpassed expectations, but felt that there were issues with pacing in first hour. Overall, he deemed Krrish to be "a terrifically exciting and compelling experience", and awarded the film 4 of 5 stars. Nikhat Kazmi noted in The Times of India that while the superhero and action sequences were appealing, there were not enough of them. He was also not excited by the romantic parts, comparing them to a sightseeing tour, first in India and then in Singapore. He said that overall, this film lacks the fun of its predecessor. On the other hand, Raja Sen said that Krrish was infinitely better than KMG, though ultimately it was all about Hrithik Roshan. Sen and Sukanya Verma, writing for Rediff, both gave the film 3 out of 5 stars, and both said that it was a good film for children. Sen summarised, "So, is it a good superhero movie? No, but it's well-intentioned. It's a full-on kiddie movie, and while a lot of us might be scornful of Krrish, it's heartening to see fantasy officially entering mainstream Bollywood." Verma agreed with other critics that it took too long for the action to get started, and said that a lot of attention was spent showing off Roshan's muscles. He summarised, "Krrish neither has the sleek aura nor the deep-rooted ideology of superheroes. What it does have is a super spirited performance from Hrithik Roshan, which is likely to appeal to children. And that's worth a three-star cheer." Saibal Chatterjee wrote in the Hindustan Times that Krrish is a hackneyed, formulaic masala film, with special effects added on top, and hoped that this would not be the future of Bollywood. Rajeev Masand of CNN-IBN condemned the screenplay and thought that the only thing that made the film watchable was the acting of Hrithik Roshan. He gave the film only 2 out of 5 stars, saying "Krrish is only an average film that could have been so much better if the makers had concentrated as hard on its story as they did on its action and stunts."

Overseas
Overseas reviews were positive. The Rotten Tomatoes aggregate rating is 88% "Fresh", based on 8 reviews, with an average rating of 7 out of 10. Richard James Havis of The Hollywood Reporter stated, "This Bollywood epic crunches together romance, comedy, extraterrestrials, martial arts, dancing and action to tell an entertaining story about a reluctant Indian superhero" but said it may be "far too crazed for foreign viewers". David Chute of LA Weekly deemed it a "hearty pulp cinema that really sticks to your ribs". Likewise, Laura Kern of The New York Times said it was a blend of carefree romance, show-stopping action and sci-fi. Ronnie Scheib of Variety said that it was an "enjoyable, daffily improbable escapist romp". He praised the action sequences as ingeniously choreographed, but very family-friendly. Though Jaspreet Pandohar of BBC was critical of the script for being "low on originality", he praised Hrithik Roshan's performance and the action scenes. Dr. P.V. Vaidyanathan, in a review for BBC Shropshire, said that the film's excellent special effects were as good as the best from Hollywood, praised Hrithik's acting, but called the music mundane.

Accolades

Krrish was one of India's possible nominations for the 2007 Academy Award for Best Foreign Film, but the country ultimately chose Rang De Basanti as its pick. Despite this, Krrish won numerous awards, including 3 Filmfare Awards—Best Special Effects, Best Action and Best Background Score—and was nominated for Best Film, Best Director, Best Actor, Best Supporting Actress and Best Villain at the 52nd Filmfare Awards. At the 2007 IIFA Awards, Krrish won Best Actor, Best Action, and Best Special Effects. Rakesh Roshan won the Creative Person of the Year title at the same ceremony. Additionally, the film was nominated in the following categories at the ceremony: Best Director, Best Music and Best Story.

Hrithik Roshan won other acting awards that year, including the Star Screen Award Best Actor, Zee Cine Award for Best Actor – Male, BFJA – Best Actor Award (Hindi) and GIFA Best Actor. The film's special effects won the National Film Award for Best Special Effects. The film also took Best Picture honours at the Matri Shree Media Awards.

In a showing of the film's popularity with children, Krrish swept the major film categories at the Pogo Amazing Kids Awards, which are voted on by children across India. Winners were: Hrithik Roshan (Most Amazing Actor — Male), Priyanka Chopra (Most Amazing Actor — Female), Krrish (Most Amazing Film), Special Effects in Krrish (Most Amazing Moment in a film).

 52nd Filmfare Awards:

Won

 Best Background Score – Salim–Sulaiman
 Best Special Effects – EFX
 Best Action – Tony Ching & Siu-Tung

Nominated

 Best Film – Rakesh Roshan
 Best Director – Rakesh Roshan
 Best Actor – Hrithik Roshan
 Best Supporting Actress – Rekha
 Best Villain – Naseeruddin Shah
 Best Sound Design – Jeetendra Choudhary, Baylon Fonsecai & Nakul KamrE

Sequel

After the success of Krrish, Rakesh Roshan announced that he would be making a sequel, tentatively titled Krrish 3. He confirmed that Hrithik Roshan and Priyanka Chopra would reprise their roles, and that the antagonists would be played by Vivek Oberoi and Kangana Ranaut.

See also
 Science fiction films in India

References

Further reading

External links
 
 
 
 
 Krrish at Bollywood Hungama

 
2006 films
2006 science fiction action films
2000s Indian superhero films
Films scored by Rajesh Roshan
Film superheroes
Films directed by Rakesh Roshan
Films set in Himachal Pradesh
Films shot in Singapore
2000s Hindi-language films
Indian science fiction action films
Indian sequel films
Films with screenplays by Robin Bhatt
Films with screenplays by Akash Khurana
Films with screenplays by Sachin Bhowmick
Films that won the Best Special Effects National Film Award
Films distributed by Yash Raj Films
Indian superhero films
Indian science fiction films